Adam Yarmolinsky (November 17, 1922 – January 5, 2000) was an American academic, educator and author, as well as a political appointee who served in numerous capacities in the Kennedy, Johnson and Carter administrations.

Besides serving in the White House, he also held posts in the Arms Control and Disarmament Agency. He was an aide to Secretary of Defense Robert McNamara at the Pentagon, where Yarmolinsky was an early critic of American policies in the Vietnam war.

Biography
Yarmolinsky attended the Fieldston School in Riverdale and then graduated from Harvard College where he was editorial director of the Harvard Crimson. He enlisted in the US Army Air Forces during World War II and rose to the rank of sergeant.

Yarmolinsky took a law degree from Yale Law School in 1948. He served as a law clerk to Chief Judge Charles E. Clark of the United States Court of Appeals for the Second Circuit, based in New York, and later as a clerk to Supreme Court Justice Stanley F. Reed during the 1950 Term.

Following his service in the U.S. government, Yarmolinsky became Regent's Professor of Public Policy at the University of Maryland, Baltimore County (UMBC), where he served as Provost. Another academic post was as Ralph Waldo Emerson Professor at the University of Massachusetts Amherst in the mid 1970s. He was also a founding member of the Institute of Medicine of the U.S. National Academy of Sciences. In 1967, Yarmolinsky was named a fellow of the American Academy of Arts and Sciences.

Marriage
On February 3, 1990, he married Dr. Sarah Ames Ellis, a clinical psychologist, in an Episcopalian ceremony in Manhattan. It was his third  marriage. His first marriage was to Harriet L Rypins.
His second marriage was to Jane Marie Cox Vonnegut, Kurt Vonnegut's first wife.  She died in 1986.

Death
He died, aged 77, at Georgetown University Hospital, of leukemia. He was survived by his third wife; his first wife, Harriet Yarmolinsky; and four children. Harriet Yarmolinsky died in January 2008 at age 81.

See also 

 List of law clerks of the Supreme Court of the United States (Seat 6)

References

External links
 
 American National Biography Online
Marriage
New York Times obituary
Washington Post obituary
University of Maryland, Baltimore campus site
Biodata
Harper's Magazine

1922 births
2000 deaths
20th-century American writers
20th-century American educators
Jewish American military personnel
United States Army Air Forces personnel of World War II
Deaths from cancer in Washington, D.C.
Deaths from leukemia
Harvard College alumni
Law clerks of the Supreme Court of the United States
Writers from Baltimore
Writers from New York City
The Harvard Crimson people
United States Army Air Forces soldiers
University of Maryland, Baltimore County faculty
Yale Law School alumni
Fellows of the American Academy of Arts and Sciences
20th-century American Jews